Sirutteok (시루떡) is a type of Korean rice cake (tteok) traditionally made by steaming rice or glutinous rice flour in a "siru" (시루). 

The Siru is an earthenware steaming vessel that dates back to the late bronze age of the Korean northern peninsula and the use of the utensil spread to the entire peninsula by the time of the Three Kingdoms (57 B.C.E-676) in which the popularity of siru-tteok grew. The Siru is also used during shamanic rituals and is even offered on the tables for daegamsin (대감신, state official God). The Siru is not an everyday utensil but is one for preparing and serving the sacrificial dishes during rituals, which also means that siru-tteok is not a casual dish for every day enjoyment.

The making of siru-tteok is said to be the oldest form of tteok (떡).

Tteok (떡), or steamed rice cake, which is made by steaming powdered rice, then pounding or rolling the dough, itself dates back to 57 B.C.E, along with the siru. The Siru-tteok dish is a layered cake of the glutinous rice that is filled often filled with beans and/or red beans (pat, 팥), and the most seen and basic sacrifice offered in rituals for household gods. This cake is generally used for bad fortune prevention rituals (aengmagi) to bring wealth, luck and health into the households. The red beans/ fillings is believed to chase away bad spirits, and the another type of siru-tteok cake is the Baekseolgi, which is pure white, and is offered to the higher gods, including Cheonsin (천신,Celestial God), Sansin (산신,Mountain God) and Yongsin (용신,Dragon God), reflecting the folk belief that the latter two are considered to be as high up and divine as Cheonsin(천신).

Preparation

Sirutteok is made by soaking rice or glutinous rice in water and then grinding it. Thus prepared, the rice flour is put in a siru and steamed. According to steaming method, sirutteok is subdivided into two groups: seolgitteok (설기떡) and kyeotteok (켜떡). Seolgitteok---also called muritteok (무리떡)---is regarded as the most basic form of sirutteok and is made only with rice. "Kyeotteok" consists of multiple layers of azuki bean or other bean powder and a rice-glutinous rice mixture.

Ingredients
The main ingredients for "sirutteok" are rice (멥쌀 mepssal in Korean) or glutinous rice (찹쌀 chapssal), which sometimes are mixed. Other grains and beans (such as azuki bean, mung bean and sesame, wheat flour or starch) can also be mixed with the rice. Various fruits and nuts are used as subsidiary ingredients, such as persimmon, peach or apricot, chestnut, walnut, and pine nut. In addition, vegetables or herbs can be used to flavor the tteok. Danggwi leaves (당귀잎; Ostericum grosseserratum), seogi mushroom (manna lichen),  radish, artemisia, pepper, and Korean wine for example, whereas honey and sugar are used as sweeteners.

Varieties
Baekseolgi (백설기) - a variety of siru tteok. It literally means white snow tteok which is made of white rice.
Kongtteok (콩떡) - tteok made with various kinds of beans
Jeungpyeon (증편) - tteok made with makgeolli (unfiltered rice wine)
Mujigae tteok (무지개떡)  - literally "rainbow tteok"; this variety of tteok has colorful stripes. The tteok is used especially for janchi (잔치), Korean banquet, party, or feast like dol (celebrating a baby's first birthday), Hwangap (celebrating 60 years old people's birthday), or gyeonhon janchi (wedding party)
Hobak-tteok

See also
Songpyeon
Korean cuisine
 List of steamed foods

References

Tteok
Steamed foods